Tiberiu Mikloş (born April 2, 1954) is a former Romanian ice hockey player. He played for the Romania men's national ice hockey team at the 1976 Winter Olympics in Innsbruck.

References

1954 births
Living people
Ice hockey players at the 1976 Winter Olympics
Olympic ice hockey players of Romania
Sportspeople from Miercurea Ciuc